Ki Teitzei, Ki Tetzei, Ki Tetse, Ki Thetze, Ki Tese, Ki Tetzey, or Ki Seitzei ( — Hebrew for "when you go," the first words in the parashah) is the 49th weekly Torah portion (parashah) in the annual Jewish cycle of Torah reading and the sixth in the Book of Deuteronomy. It comprises . The parashah sets out a series of miscellaneous laws, mostly governing civil and domestic life, including ordinances regarding a beautiful captive of war, inheritance among the sons of two wives, a wayward son, the corpse of an executed person, found property, coming upon another in distress, rooftop safety, prohibited mixtures, sexual offenses, membership in the congregation, camp hygiene, runaway slaves, prostitution, usury, vows, gleaning, kidnapping, repossession, prompt payment of wages, vicarious liability, flogging, treatment of domestic animals, levirate marriage (yibbum), weights and measures, and wiping out the memory of Amalek.

The parashah is made up of 5,856 Hebrew letters, 1,582 Hebrew words, 110 verses, and 213 lines in a Torah Scroll (Sefer Torah). Jews generally read the parashah in August or September. Jews also read the part of the parashah about Amalek, as the concluding (maftir) reading on Shabbat Zachor, the special Sabbath immediately before Purim, which commemorates the story of Esther and the Jewish people's victory over Haman's plan to kill the Jews, told in the book of Esther.  identifies Haman as an Agagite, and thus a descendant of Amalek.

Readings
In the Masoretic Text of the Tanakh (Hebrew Bible), Parashah Ki Teitzei has two "open portion" (petuchah) divisions (roughly equivalent to paragraphs, abbreviated with the Hebrew letter  (peh)). Parashah Ki Teitzei has several further subdivisions, called "closed portions" (setumah) (abbreviated with the Hebrew letter  (samekh)) within the first open portion. The long first open portion spans nearly the entire parashah, except for the concluding maftir reading. The short second open portion coincides with maftir reading. Thus the parashah is nearly one complete whole. Closed portion divisions divide all of the readings, often setting apart separate laws.

First reading — Deuteronomy 21:10–21
In the first reading (aliyah), Moses directed the Israelites that when they took captives in war, and an Israelite saw among the captives a beautiful woman whom he wanted to marry, the Israelite was to bring her into his house and have her trim her hair, pare her nails, discard her captive's garb, and spend a month lamenting her parents. Thereafter, the Israelite could take her as his wife. But if he found that he no longer wanted her, he had to release her outright, and not sell her as a slave. A closed portion (setumah) ends here.

In the continuation of the reading, Moses instructed that if a man had two wives, one loved and one unloved, and both bore him sons, but the unloved one bore him his firstborn son, then when he willed his property to his sons, he could not treat the son of the loved wife as firstborn in disregard of the older son of the unloved wife; rather, he was required to accept the firstborn, the son of the unloved one, and allot to him his birthright of a double portion of all that he possessed. A closed portion (setumah) ends here.

In the continuation of the reading, Moses instructed that if a couple had a wayward and defiant son, who did not obey his father or mother even after they disciplined him, then they were to bring him to the elders of his town and publicly declare their son to be disloyal, defiant, heedless, a glutton, and a drunkard. The men of his town were then to stone him to death.  (See laws in Maimonides' Mishne Torah, Mamrim ch.7.)

The first reading (aliyah) and a closed portion (setumah) end here.

Second reading — Deuteronomy 21:22–22:7
In the second reading (aliyah), Moses instructed that if the community executed a man for a capital offense and impaled him on a stake, they were not to let his corpse remain on the stake overnight, but were to bury him the same day, for an impaled body affronted God. A closed portion (setumah) ends here with the end of the chapter.

In the continuation of the reading, Moses instructed that if one found another's lost ox, sheep, donkey, garment, or any other lost thing, then the finder could not ignore it, but was required to take it back to its owner. If the owner did not live near the finder or the finder did not know who the owner was, then the finder was to bring the thing home and keep it until the owner claimed it. A closed portion (setumah) ends here.

In the continuation of the reading, Moses instructed that if one came upon another's donkey or ox fallen on the road, then one could not ignore it, but was required to help the owner to raise it. A closed portion (setumah) ends here.

In the continuation of the reading, Moses instructed that a woman was not to put on man's apparel, nor a man wear woman's clothing. Another closed portion (setumah) ends here.

And as the reading continues, Moses instructed that if one came upon a bird's nest with the mother bird sitting over fledglings or eggs, then one could not take the mother together with her young, but was required to let the mother go and take only the young. The second reading (aliyah) and a closed portion (setumah) end here.

Third reading — Deuteronomy 22:8–23:7
In the third reading (aliyah), Moses taught that when one built a new house, one had to make a parapet for the roof, so that no one should fall from it. One was not to sow a vineyard with a second kind of seed, nor use the yield of such a vineyard. A closed portion (setumah) ends here.

In the continuation of the reading, Moses instructed that one was not to plow with an ox and a donkey together. One was not to wear cloth combining wool and linen. A closed portion (setumah) ends here.

In the continuation of the reading, Moses instructed that one was to make tassels (tzitzit) on the four corners of the garment with which one covered oneself. Another closed portion (setumah) ends here.

As the reading continues, Moses instructed that if a man married a woman, cohabited with her, took an aversion to her, and falsely charged her with not having been a virgin at the time of the marriage, then the woman's parents were to produce the cloth with evidence of the woman's virginity before the town elders at the town gate. The elders were then to have the man flogged and fine him 100 shekels of silver to be paid to the woman's father. The woman was to remain the man's wife, and he was never to have the right to divorce her. A closed portion (setumah) ends here.

In the continuation of the reading, Moses instructed that if the elders found that woman had not been a virgin, then the woman was to be brought to the entrance of her father's house and stoned to death by the men of her town. A closed portion (setumah) ends here.

In the continuation of the reading, Moses instructed that if a man was found lying with another man's wife, both the man and the woman with whom he lay were to die. Another closed portion (setumah) ends here.

As the reading continues, Moses instructed that if, in a city, a man lay with a virgin who was engaged to a man, then the authorities were to take the two of them to the town gate and stone them to death — the girl because she did not cry for help, and the man because he violated another man's wife. A closed portion (setumah) ends here.

In the continuation of the reading, Moses instructed that if the man lay with the girl by force in the open country, only the man was to die, for there was no one to save her. Another closed portion (setumah) ends here.

In the continuation of the reading, Moses instructed that if a man seized a virgin who was not engaged and lay with her, then the man was to pay the girl's father 50 shekels of silver, she was to become the man's wife, and he was never to have the right to divorce her. A closed portion (setumah) ends here with the end of the chapter.

As the reading continues in chapter 23, Moses instructed that no man could marry his father's former wife. A closed portion (setumah) ends here.

In the continuation of the reading, Moses taught that God's congregation could not admit into membership anyone whose testes were crushed or whose member was cut off. A closed portion (setumah) ends here.

In the continuation of the reading, Moses taught that God's congregation could not admit into membership anyone misbegotten (mamzer) or anyone descended within ten generations from one misbegotten. A closed portion (setumah) ends here.

And as the reading continues, Moses instructed that God's congregation could not admit into membership any Ammonite or Moabite, or anyone descended within ten generations from an Ammonite or Moabite. As long as they lived, Israelites were not to concern themselves with the welfare or benefit of Ammonites or Moabites, because they did not meet the Israelites with food and water after the Israelites left Egypt, and because they hired Balaam to curse the Israelites — but God refused to heed Balaam, turning his curse into a blessing. The third reading (aliyah) and a closed portion (setumah) end here.

Fourth reading — Deuteronomy 23:8–24
In the fourth reading (aliyah), Moses told the Israelites not to abhor the Edomites, for they were kinsman, nor Egyptians, for the Israelites were strangers in Egypt. Great grandchildren of Edomites or Egyptians could be admitted into the congregation. A closed portion (setumah) ends here.

In the continuation of the reading, Moses taught that any Israelite rendered unclean by a nocturnal emission had to leave the Israelites military camp, bathe in water toward evening, and reenter the camp at sundown. The Israelites were to designate an area outside the camp where they might relieve themselves, and to carry a spike to dig a hole and cover up their excrement. As God moved about in their camp to protect them, the Israelites were to keep their camp holy. A closed portion (setumah) ends here.

In the continuation of the reading, Moses taught that if a slave sought refuge with the Israelites, the Israelites were not to turn the slave over to the slave's master, but were to let the former slave live in any place the former slave might choose and not ill-treat the former slave. A closed portion (setumah) ends here.

In the continuation of the reading, Moses forbade the Israelites to act as harlots, sodomites, or cult prostitutes, and from bringing the wages of prostitution into the house of God in fulfillment of any vow. A closed portion (setumah) ends here.

In the continuation of the reading, Moses forbade the Israelites to charge interest on loans to their countrymen, but they could charge interest on loans to foreigners. A closed portion (setumah) ends here.

In the continuation of the reading, Moses required the Israelites promptly to fulfill vows to God, but they incurred no guilt if they refrained from vowing. The fourth reading (aliyah) and a closed portion (setumah) end here.

Fifth reading — Deuteronomy 23:25–24:4
In the fifth reading (aliyah), Moses allowed a worker working in a vineyard to eat grapes until full, but the worker was forbidden to put any in a vessel. A closed portion (setumah) ends here.

As the reading continues, Moses allowed a worker working in a field of standing grain to pluck ears by hand, but the worker was forbidden to cut the neighbor's grain with a sickle. A closed portion (setumah) ends here with the end of the chapter.

As the reading continues in chapter 24, Moses instructed that a divorced woman who remarried and then lost her second husband to divorce or death could not remarry her first husband. The fifth reading (aliyah) and a closed portion (setumah) end here.

Sixth reading — Deuteronomy 24:5–13
In the sixth reading (aliyah), Moses exempted a newlywed man from army duty for one year, so as to give happiness to his wife. Israelites were forbidden to take a handmill or an upper millstone in pawn, for that would be taking someone's livelihood. A closed portion (setumah) ends here.

In the continuation of the reading, Moses taught that one found to have kidnapped a fellow Israelite was to die. A closed portion (setumah) ends here.

In the continuation of the reading, Moses taught that in cases of a skin affection, Israelites were to do exactly as the priests instructed, remembering that God afflicted and then healed Miriam’s skin after the Israelites left Egypt. A closed portion (setumah) ends here.

In the continuation of the reading, Moses forbade an Israelite who lent to a fellow Israelite to enter the borrower’s house to seize a pledge, and required the lender to remain outside while the borrower brought the pledge out to the lender. If the borrower was needy, the lender was forbidden to sleep in the pledge, but had to return the pledge to the borrower at sundown, so that the borrower might sleep in the cloth and bless the lender before God. The sixth reading (aliyah) and a closed portion (setumah) end here.

Seventh reading — Deuteronomy 24:14–25:19
In the seventh reading (aliyah), Moses forbade the Israelites to abuse a needy and destitute laborer, whether an Israelite or a stranger, and were required to pay the laborer's wages on the same day, before the sun set, as the laborer would depend on the wages. A closed portion (setumah) ends here.

In the continuation of the reading, Moses taught that parents were not to be put to death for children, nor were children to be put to death for parents; a person was to be put to death only for the person's own crime. A closed portion (setumah) ends here.

In the continuation of the reading, Moses forbade the Israelites to subvert the rights of the proselyte or the orphan, and forbade the Israelites to take a widow’s garment in pawn, remembering that they were slaves in Egypt and that God redeemed them. A closed portion (setumah) ends here.

In the continuation of the reading, Moses instructed that when Israelites reaped the harvest in their fields and overlooked a sheaf, they were not to turn back to get it, but were to leave it to the proselyte, the orphan, and the widow. A closed portion (setumah) ends here.

In the continuation of the reading, Moses instructed that when Israelites beat down the fruit of their olive trees or gathered the grapes of their vineyards, they were not to go over them again, but were leave what remained for the proselyte, the orphan, and the widow, remembering that they were slaves in Egypt. A closed portion (setumah) ends here with the end of the chapter.

As the reading continues in chapter 25, Moses instructed that when one was to be flogged, the judge was to have the guilty one lie down and be whipped in his presence, as warranted but with no more than 40 lashes, so that the guilty one would not be degraded. Israelites were forbidden to muzzle an ox while it was threshing. A closed portion (setumah) ends here.

In the continuation of the reading, Moses instructed that when brothers dwelt together and one of them died leaving no son, the surviving brother was to marry the wife of the deceased and perform the levir's duty, and the first son that she bore was to be accounted to the dead brother, that his name might survive. But if the surviving brother did not want to marry his brother's widow, then the widow was to appear before the elders at the town gate and declare that the brother refused to perform the levir's duty, the elders were to talk to him, and if he insisted, the widow was to go up to him before the elders, pull the sandal off his foot, spit in his face, and declare: "Thus shall be done to the man who will not build up his brother’s house!" They would then call him "the family of the unsandaled one." A closed portion (setumah) ends here.

In the continuation of the reading, Moses instructed that if two men fought with each other, and to save her husband the wife of one seized the other man's genitals, then her hand was to be cut off. A closed portion (setumah) ends here.

In the continuation of the reading, Moses forbade Israelites to have alternate weights or measures, larger and smaller, and required them to have completely honest weights and measures. The long first open portion (petuchah) ends here.

Parashat Zachor

In the maftir reading of  that concludes the parashah, Moses enjoined the Israelites to remember what the Amalekites did to them on their journey, after they left Egypt, surprising them and cutting down all the stragglers at their rear. The Israelites were enjoined never to forget to blot out the memory of Amalek from under heaven. The second open portion (petuchah) ends here with the end of the parashah.  This maftir is always read on the Sabbath that comes before Purim.

Readings according to the triennial cycle
Jews who read the Torah according to the triennial cycle of Torah reading read the parashah according to the following schedule:

In ancient parallels
The parashah has parallels in these ancient sources:

Deuteronomy chapter 25

In inner-biblical interpretation
The parashah has parallels or is discussed in these Biblical sources:

Deuteronomy chapters 12–26

Deuteronomy chapter 21

Deuteronomy chapter 22
The instruction in  that parallels  states that the duty to restore a fallen donkey or ox applies to one's enemy's animals as well as to one's brother's.

Deuteronomy chapter 23
 recalls the Moabites' refusal to meet the Israelites with bread and water.  records the Israelites' request for safe passage and supplies through the land of the Moabites.  first mention of the Moabites, reporting that they descended from Lot.

Deuteronomy chapter 24
The Hebrew Bible reports skin disease (tzara’at) and a person affected by skin disease (metzora) at several places, often (and sometimes incorrectly) translated as "leprosy" and "a leper." In , to help Moses to convince others that God had sent him, God instructed Moses to put his hand into his bosom, and when he took it out, his hand was "leprous (m’tzora’at), as white as snow." In , the Torah sets out regulations for skin disease (tzara’at) and a person affected by skin disease (metzora). In  after Miriam spoke against Moses, God's cloud removed from the Tent of Meeting and "Miriam was leprous (m’tzora’at), as white as snow." In the current parashah, Moses warned the Israelites in the case of skin disease (tzara’at) diligently to observe all that the priests would teach them, remembering what God did to Miriam. In 2 Kings , part of the haftarah for parashah Tazria, the prophet Elisha cures Naaman, the commander of the army of the king of Aram, who was a "leper" (metzora). In , part of the haftarah for parashah Metzora, the story is told of four "leprous men" (m’tzora’im) at the gate during the Arameans’ siege of Samaria. And in 2 Chronicles , after King Uzziah tried to burn incense in the Temple in Jerusalem, "leprosy (tzara’at) broke forth on his forehead."

 and 17–22 admonish the Israelites not to wrong the stranger, for "you shall remember that you were a bondman in Egypt."

In , the prophet used the practice of leaving olives on the boughs and grapes in the vineyard for gleanings (as required by ) as a sign of hope for Israel when he forecast the nation's downfall: "In that day it shall come to pass that the glory of Jacob will wane ... yet gleaning grapes will be left in it, like the shaking of an olive tree, two or three olives at the top of the uppermost bough, four or five in its most fruitful branches."

Deuteronomy chapter 25

Proverbs 11:1 repeats the teaching that "dishonest scales are an abomination to the Lord" as well as those who use them.

At Moses' direction it was also recorded in another ancient text, possibly the Book of the Wars of the Lord, "I will utterly blot out the remembrance of Amalek from under heaven.".

In 1 Samuel , the prophet Samuel conveys the command of God to King Saul to "punish Amalek for what he did to Israel". Saul "utterly destroyed" the Amalekites; initially he spared Agag their king, but Samuel killed him later.

In early nonrabbinic interpretation
The parashah has parallels or is discussed in these early nonrabbinic sources:

Deuteronomy chapter 23
The Damascus Document of the Qumran sect prohibited non-cash transactions with Jews who were not members of the sect. Apparently, the Qumran sect viewed prevailing methods of conducting business through credit as violating those laws.

Philo read  to instruct us to be prompt in our gratitude to God. Philo cited Cain as an example of a "self-loving man" who (in ) showed his gratitude to God too slowly. Philo taught that we should hurry to please God without delay. Thus  enjoins, "If you vow a vow, you shall not delay to perform it." Philo explained that a vow is a request to God for good things, and  thus enjoins that when one has received them, one must offer gratitude to God as soon as possible. Philo divided those who fail to do so into three types: (1) those who forget the benefits that they have received, (2) those who from an excessive conceit look upon themselves and not God as the authors of what they receive, and (3) those who realize that God caused what they received, but still say that they deserved it, because they are worthy to receive God's favor. Philo taught that Scripture opposes all three. Philo taught that  replies to the first group who forget, "Take care, lest when you have eaten and are filled, and when you have built fine houses and inhabited them, and when your flocks and your herds have increased, and when your silver and gold, and all that you possess is multiplied, you be lifted up in your heart, and forget the Lord your God." Philo taught that one does not forget God when one remembers one's own nothingness and God's exceeding greatness. Philo interpreted  to reprove those who look upon themselves as the cause of what they have received, telling them: "Say not my own might, or the strength of my right hand has acquired me all this power, but remember always the Lord your God, who gives you the might to acquire power." And Philo read  to address those who think that they deserve what they have received when it says, "You do not enter into this land to possess it because of your righteousness, or because of the holiness of your heart; but, in the first place, because of the iniquity of these nations, since God has brought on them the destruction of wickedness; and in the second place, that He may establish the covenant that He swore to our Fathers." Philo interpreted the term "covenant" figuratively to mean God's graces. Thus Philo concluded that if we discard forgetfulness, ingratitude, and self-love, we shall not longer through our delay miss attaining the genuine worship of God, but we shall meet God, having prepared ourselves to do the things that God commands us.

A Dead Sea Scroll manuscript from Qumran Cave 4, probably dated to the turn of the common era, deduced from  that a poor person could eat ears of corn in the field of another person, but was not allowed to take any home. On a threshing-floor, however, the poor person could both eat and gather provisions for his family.

In classical rabbinic interpretation
The parashah is discussed in these rabbinic sources from the era of the Mishnah and the Talmud:

Deuteronomy chapter 21

Deuteronomy 21:10–14 — the beautiful captive
The Gemara taught that  provided the law of taking a beautiful captive only as an allowance for human passions. Rav said that  permitted a priest to take a beautiful captive, while Samuel maintained that it was forbidden.

The Gemara taught that the procedure of  applied only when the captive did not accept the commandments, for if she accepted the commandments, then she could be immersed in a ritual bath (mikveh), and she and the soldier could marry immediately. Rabbi Eliezer reasoned that  specified an act with respect to the head and an act with respect to the nails, and as the former meant removal, so should the latter. Rabbi Akiva reasoned that  specified disfigurement for the head, so it must mean disfigurement for the nails, as well.

But Rabbi Akiva interpreted the words to mean idolatry, citing . A Baraita taught that "a full month" meant 30 days. But Rabbi Simeon ben Eleazar interpreted  to call for 90 days — 30 days for "month," 30 days for "full," and 30 days for "and after that." Rabina said that one could say that "month" meant 30 days, "full" meant 30 days, and "and after that" meant an equal number (30 plus 30) again, for a total of 120 days.

Deuteronomy 21:15–17 — inheritance among the sons of two wives
The Mishnah interpreted  to teach that a son and a daughter have equal inheritance rights, except that a firstborn son takes a double portion in his father's estate but does not take a double portion in his mother's estate. But a father could distribute his property as gifts during his lifetime so that one son received more than another, or so that the firstborn received merely an equal share, so long as the father did not try to make these conveyances as an inheritance upon his death.

Once Rabbi Jannai was walking, leaning on the shoulder of Rabbi Simlai his attendant, and Rabbi Judah the Prince came to meet them. Rabbi Judah the Prince asked Rabbi Jannai what the Scriptural basis was for the proposition that a son takes precedence over a daughter in the inheritance of a mother's estate. Rabbi Jannai replied that the plural use of the term "tribes" in the discussion of the inheritance of the daughters of Zelophehad in  indicates that the mother's tribe is to be compared to the father's tribe, and as in the case of the father's tribe, a son takes precedence over a daughter, so in the case of the mother's tribe, a son should take precedence over a daughter. Rabbi Judah the Prince challenged Rabbi Jannai, saying that if it this were so, one could say that as in the case of the father's tribe, a firstborn takes a double portion, so in the case of the mother's tribe would a firstborn take a double portion. Rabbi Jannai dismissed the remark of Rabbi Judah the Prince. The Gemara then inquired why it is true that a firstborn son takes a double share in his father's estate but not his mother's. Abaye replied that  says, "of all that he [the father] has," implying all that "he" (the father) has and not all that "she" (the mother) has. The Gemara asked whether the proposition that a firstborn son takes a double portion only in the estate of his father might apply only in the case where a bachelor married a widow (who had children from her first marriage, and thus the father's firstborn son was not that of the mother). And thus where a bachelor married a virgin (so that the firstborn son of the father would also be the firstborn son of the mother) might the firstborn son also take a double portion in his mother's estate? Rav Naḥman bar Isaac replied that  says, "for he [the firstborn son] is the first-fruits of his [the father’s] strength," from which we can infer that the law applies to the first fruits of the father's strength and not the first-fruits of the mother's strength. The Gemara replied that  teaches that though a son was born after a miscarriage (and thus did not "open the womb" and is not regarded as a firstborn son for purposes of "sanctification to the Lord" and "redemption from the priest" in ) he is nonetheless regarded as the firstborn son for purposes of inheritance.  thus implies that only the son for whom the father's heart grieves is included in the law, but a miscarriage, for which the father's heart does not grieve, is excluded. (And thus, since  is necessary for this deduction, it could not have been meant for the proposition that the law applies to the first fruits of the father's strength and not of the mother's strength.) But then the Gemara reasoned that if  is necessary for excluding miscarriages, then  should have read, "for he is the first-fruits of strength," but  in fact says, "his strength." But where a bachelor married a virgin (and thus the son would be the firstborn of both the father and the mother), the firstborn son might take a double portion also in his mother's estate. But Rava concluded that  states, "the right of the firstborn is his [the father’s]," and this indicates that the right of the firstborn applies to a man's estate and not to a woman's.

A Midrash told that the Ishmaelites came before Alexander the Great to dispute the birthright with Israel, accompanied by the Canaanites and the Egyptians. Gebiah the son of Kosem representing the Jews, asked Alexander whether a man could not do as he wished to his sons. When Alexander replied that a man could, Gebiah quoted , "And Abraham gave all that he had to Isaac." The Ishmaelites asked where the deed of gift to his other sons was. Gebiah replied by quoting , "But to the sons of the concubines, whom Abraham had, Abraham gave gifts." Thereupon the Ishmaelites departed in shame.

Deuteronomy 21:18–21 — the wayward son
A Baraita taught that there never was a "stubborn and rebellious son" and never would be, and that  was written merely that we might study it and receive reward for the studying (see also under Ir nidachat). But Rabbi Jonathan said that he saw a stubborn and rebellious son and sat on his grave.

The Mishnah exempted a minor, because minors did not come within the scope of the commandments. And the Mishnah deduced that a boy became liable to being considered "a stubborn and rebellious son" from the time that he grew two genital pubic hairs until his pubic hair grew around his genitalia. Rav Judah taught in Rav's name that  implied that the son had to be nearly a man.

The Mishnah interpreted the words "then his father and his mother shall lay hold on him" to exclude a boy if one of his parents had a hand or fingers cut off. The Mishnah interpreted the words "and bring him out" to exclude a boy who had a lame parent. The Mishnah interpreted the words "and they shall say" to exclude a boy who had a parent who could not speak. The Mishnah interpreted the words "this our son" to exclude a boy who had a blind parent. The Mishnah interpreted the words "he will not obey our voice" to exclude a boy who had a deaf parent.

Deuteronomy 21:22–23 — dignity in death
Interpreting , the Mishnah taught that they would hang a transgressor for only a very short time, and then immediately untie the corpse. The Mishnah taught that leaving the corpse hanging overnight would transgress  and desecrate the name of Heaven, reminding everybody of the deceased's transgression. The Tosefta taught that in order to fulfill the commandment of hanging the transgressor, one person tied as another person untied. Reading , Rabbi Meir compared the situation to two brothers who were very similar to each other. One was the master of the whole world and the other was bandit. They caught the bandit and crucified him, and everyone who passed by said that it seemed as though the master had been crucified! Therefore  says “he that is hanged is a reproach to God." In the Babylonian Talmud, Rabbi Meir compared it to two brothers who were twins and lived in the same city. One was appointed king, while the other became a bandit. The king commanded that his brother be punished, and they hanged the bandit brother for his crimes. Anyone who saw the bandit hanging would say that the king had been hanged. The king, therefore, commanded that his brother be taken down. If God suffers such distress over the blood of the wicked, even though they justly deserved their punishment, one can infer a fortiori that God suffers distress over the blood of the righteous.

Deuteronomy chapter 22
And Rava taught that  required a person to return the animal even a hundred times. If one found an identifiable item and the identity of the owner was unknown, the Mishnah taught that the finder was required to announce it. Rabbi Meir taught that the finder was obliged to announce it until his neighbors could know of it. Rabbi Judah maintained that the finder had to announce it until three festivals had passed plus an additional seven days after the last festival, allowing three days for going home, three days for returning, and one day for announcing.

Rava taught that , “And so shall you do with every lost item of your brother,” serves to include an obligation to protect one's brother from the loss of his land. Rav Ḥananya replied that a Baraita taught that if one saw water that is flowing and coming to inundate another's field, one must establish a barrier before the water in order to preserve the other's field.

If the owner sat down and said, "Since the commandment is on you, if you wish to unload, unload," one was not obligated, for  says "with him." But if the owner was aged or sick, one was obligated to lift even without the owner's help. The Gemara concluded that  and  require people to prevent suffering to animals. And the Gemara argued that when the Mishnah exempts the passerby when the owner does not participate in unloading the burden, it means that the passerby is exempt from unloading the burden for free, but is obligated to do so for remuneration.

The Mishnah read  to require a person to let the mother bird go again and again, even if the mother bird kept coming back to the nest four or five times. And the Gemara taught that  required a person to let the mother bird go even a hundred times.

One could (1) plow with an ox and a donkey yoked together (in violation of ) (2 and 3) that are two animals dedicated to the sanctuary, (4) plowing mixed seeds sown in a vineyard (in violation of ), (5) during a Sabbatical year (in violation of ), (6) on a Festival-day (in violation of, for example), (7) when the plower is a priest (in violation of ) and (8) a Nazirite (in violation of ) plowing in a contaminated place. They said to him that this would not be in the same category as the other violations. He replied that neither is the Nazirite in the same category as the other violations.

 calls on the Israelites to obey God's "statutes" (chukim) and "ordinances" (mishpatim). The Rabbis in a Baraita taught that the "ordinances" (mishpatim) were commandments that logic would have dictated that we follow even had Scripture not commanded them, like the laws concerning idolatry, adultery, bloodshed, robbery, and blasphemy.

Similarly, reading , "My ordinances (mishpatai) shall you do, and My statutes (chukotai) shall you keep," the Sifra distinguished "ordinances" (mishpatim) from "statutes" (chukim). The term "ordinances" (mishpatim), taught the Sifra, refers to rules that even had they not been written in the Torah, it would have been entirely logical to write them, like laws pertaining to theft, sexual immorality, idolatry, blasphemy and murder. In regard to these, taught the Sifra, the Torah says simply that God legislated them and we have no right to raise doubts about them.

So one should separate from transgression and accept the rule of Heaven.

The Mishnah taught that the fines for rape, seduction, the husband who falsely accused his bride of not having been a virgin (as in ), and any judicial court matter are not canceled by the Sabbatical year.

Deuteronomy chapter 23
Interpreting , "An Ammonite or a Moabite shall not enter into the assembly of the Lord," the Mishnah taught that whereas an Ammonite and a Moabite are forbidden to enter into the congregation of Israel, their women are permitted immediately (following conversion). The Babylonian Talmud reported that Rava said that this tradition came from the prophet Samuel, and it thus allowed David (whom  reports descended from Ruth the Moabite) and his family to marry into the Israelite congregation.

Elsewhere, the Mishnah reported that an Ammonite convert named Judah came to the house of study and asked whether he could join the assembly. Rabban Gamaliel forbade him, but Rabbi Joshua permitted him. Rabban Gamaliel quoted , "An Ammonite or a Moabite shall not enter into the assembly of the Lord." But Rabbi Joshua asked whether the Ammonites or Moabites were still in their own territory, as Sennacherib, the king of Assyria, had long before conquered and mingled all the nations, as  reports. So they permitted the Ammonite to enter the assembly.

Rabbi Abba bar Kahana said that all of Balaam's curses, which God turned into blessings, reverted to curses (and Balaam's intention was eventually fulfilled), except for Balaam's blessing of Israel's synagogues and schoolhouses, for  says, "But the Lord your God turned the curse into a blessing for you, because the Lord your God loved you," using the singlular "curse," and not the plural "curses" (so that God turned only the first intended curse permanently into a blessing, that concerning synagogues and school-houses, which are destined never to disappear from Israel). Rabbi Johanan taught that God reversed every curse that Balaam intended into a blessing.

Rabbi Jose noted that the law of  rewarded the Egyptians for their hospitality notwithstanding that  indicated that the Egyptians befriended the Israelites only for their own benefit. Rabbi Jose concluded that if Providence thus rewarded one with mixed motives, Providence will reward even more one who selflessly shows hospitality to a scholar.

The High Priest answered the layman that he was a priest and needed to go along a ritually clean path, and that it would thus not be proper for him to walk among graves. The High Priest said that if the layman would come with the priest, it was well and good, but if not, the priest would eventually have to leave the layman and go his own way.

Rabbi Eleazar ben Perata taught that manna counteracted the ill effects of foreign foods on the Israelites.

Rabbi Eliezer ruled it valid, as  states, "You shall not bring the hire of a harlot or the price of a dog into the house of the Lord your God," and the red cow was not brought into the house.

From the passage, "which goes up on its firewood upon the altar all night," the Rabbis deduced that once a thing had been placed upon the altar, it could not be taken down all night. According to Rabbi Judah, they exclude (1) an animal slaughtered at night, (2) an animal whose blood was spilled, and (3) an animal whose blood was carried out beyond the curtains. Rabbi Judah taught that if any of these things had been placed on the altar, it was brought down. Rabbi Simeon noted that  says "burnt-offering." From this, Rabbi Simeon taught that one can only know that a fit burnt-offering remained on the altar. But Rabbi Simeon taught that the phrase "the law of the burnt-offering" intimates one law for all burnt-offerings, namely, that if they were placed on the altar, they were not removed. Rabbi Simeon taught that this law applied to animals that were slaughtered at night, or whose blood was spilt, or whose blood passed out of the curtains, or whose flesh spent the night away from the altar, or whose flesh went out, or were unclean, or were slaughtered with the intention of burning its flesh after time or out of bounds, or whose blood was received and sprinkled by unfit priests, or whose blood was applied below the scarlet line when it should have been applied above, or whose blood was applied above when it should have been applied below, or whose blood was applied outside when it should have been applied within, or whose blood was applied within when it should have been applied outside, or a Passover-offering or a sin-offering that one slaughtered for a different purpose. Rabbi Simeon suggested that one might think that law would also include an animal used for bestiality, set aside for an idolatrous sacrifice or worshipped, a harlot's hire or the price of a dog (as referred to in ), or a mixed breed, or a trefah (a torn or otherwise disqualified animal), or an animal calved through the cesarean section. But Rabbi Simeon taught that the word "This" serves to exclude these. Rabbi Simeon explained that he included the former in the general rule because their disqualification arose in the sanctuary, while he excluded the latter because their disqualification did not arise in the sanctuary.

The Rabbis taught that Providence examines one's record of deeds on three occasions: (1) if one goes on a journey alone, (2) if one sits in an unstable house, and (3) if one vows and does not fulfill one's vow. The Midrash illustrated this by noting that when Jacob left Canaan for to Aram-Naharaim,  reports, “Jacob made a vow.” Then he became wealthy, returned, and did not pay his vow. So God brought the angel against him, and the angel wrestled with Jacob but did not kill him, as  reports, “Jacob was left alone. And a man wrestled with him until the break of dawn.” The Midrash taught that it was Samael, Esau's guardian angel, who wanted to kill him, as  reports, “He saw that he could not prevail against him.” But Jacob left disabled. When Jacob still did not pay his vow, as  reports, “Rachel died and was buried.” Then God asked how long Jacob would take punishment and not pay attention to the sin for which he suffered. So God told Jacob to go to Bethel, make an altar there, at the very place where Jacob vowed to God.

Tractate Bava Metzia in the Mishnah, Tosefta, Jerusalem Talmud, and Babylonian Talmud interpreted the laws of  regarding eating the fruit of another's vineyard or field. The Mishnah taught that a worker could eat cucumbers or dates even to a denar's worth. Rabbi Elazar ben Hisma said that a worker could not eat more than the value of the worker's wages. But the Sages allowed a worker to do so, but advised that they teach the worker not to be so gluttonous as to close the door against the worker's own future employment. The Tosefta taught that workers were allowed to eat bread with brine (before working) so that they would (get thirsty and) eat a lot of grapes. But the employer was also allowed to give the workers wine to drink so that they would not eat a lot of grapes. And the Tosefta taught that workers who guarded four or five cucumber patches should not fill their bellies from only one of the patches, but should eat a bit from each patch in proportion The Jerusalem Talmud asked whether  applied to anybody who wandered into a field
and began to eat. Thus,  goes on say, “But you shall not wave a sickle in your neighbor’s standing grain,” and this encompasses only one who had permission to wave a sickle in the neighbor's standing grain, and that must mean a worker. Issi ben Aqabiah, however, said that Scripture speaks of anybody who enters the field, not just workers. The Jerusalem Talmud explained that  says, "But you shall not wave a sickle in your neighbor’s standing grain," to teach that one has the right to eat from the crop only
during the time that the sickle is being waved, that is, harvest time. In the Babylonian Talmud, however, Rav objected that Issi's view would not let any farmer remain in business. Interpreting the words "but you shall not put any in your vessel", the Gemara taught that the worker was not to put any in a vessel to take home.

Deuteronomy chapter 24

The Mishnah interpreted  to prohibit a creditor from taking in security not only millstones, but everything employed in the preparation of food for human consumption. For the continuation of  says of the creditor, "for he takes a man's life to pledge" (and the debtor needs such utensils to prepare the food necessary to sustain life).

For the Torah (in ) says, "If a man be found stealing any of his brethren of the children of Israel . . . and sell him, then that thief shall die," and yet Joseph's brothers sold their brother.

Rabbi Eliezer the Great taught that the Torah warns against wronging a stranger in 36, or others say 46, places (including  and 17–22). The Gemara taught that thus a proverb says: If there is a case of hanging in a person's family history, do not say to the person, "Hang up this fish for me."

If engaged by the night, the worker could collect the wages all of the following day. If engaged by the hour, the worker could collect the wages all that day and night. If engaged by the week, month, year, or 7-year period, if the worker's time expired during the day, the worker could collect the wages all that day. If the worker's time expired during the night, the worker could collect the wages all that night and the following day.

The Mishnah taught that the hire of persons, animals, or utensils were all subject to the law of  that "in the same day you shall give him his hire" and the law of  that "the wages of a hired servant shall not abide with you all night until the morning." The employer became liable only when the worker or vendor demanded payment from the employer. Otherwise, the employer did not infringe the law. If the employer gave the worker or vendor a draft on a shopkeeper or a money changer, the employer complied with the law. A worker who claimed the wages within the set time could collect payment if the worker merely swore that the employer had not yet paid. But if the set time had passed, the worker's oath was insufficient to collect payment. Yet if the worker had witnesses that the worker had demanded payment (within the set time), the worker could still swear and receive payment.

The Mishnah taught that the employer of a resident alien was subject to the law of  that "in the same day you shall give him his hire" (as  refers to the stranger), but not to the law of  that "the wages of a hired servant shall not abide with you all night until the morning."

The Gemara reconciled apparently discordant verses touching on vicarious responsibility. The Gemara noted that  states: "The fathers shall not be put to death for the children, neither shall the children be put to death for the fathers; every man shall be put to death for his own sin," but  (20:5 in NJPS) says: "visiting the iniquity of the fathers upon the children." The Gemara then questioned whether the words "they shall stumble one upon another" in  do not teach that one will stumble through the sin of the other, that all are held responsible for one another. The Gemara answered that the vicarious responsibility of which  speaks is limited to those who have the power to restrain their fellow from evil but do not do so.

The Gemara explained that Rabbi Judah (reading the text literally) expounded the view that no pledge may be taken from her whether she is rich or poor. Rabbi Simeon, however, (addressing the purpose of the text) taught that a wealthy widow was subject to distraint, but not a poor one, for the creditor was bound (by ) to return the pledge to her, and would bring her into disrepute among her neighbors (by her frequent visits to the creditor).

The Mishnah taught that the Torah defines no minimum or maximum for the donation of the corners of one's field to the poor. But the Mishnah also taught that one should not make the amount left to the poor less than one-sixtieth of the entire crop. And even though no definite amount is given, the amount given should accord with the size of the field, the number of poor people, and the extent of the yield.

Rabbi Eliezer taught that one who cultivates land in which one can plant a quarter kav of seed is obligated to give a corner to the poor. Rabbi Joshua said land that yields two seah of grain. Rabbi Tarfon said land of at least six handbreadths by six handbreadths. Rabbi Judah ben Betera said land that requires two strokes of a sickle to harvest, and the law is as he spoke. Rabbi Akiva said that one who cultivates land of any size is obligated to give a corner to the poor and the first fruits.

The Mishnah taught that the poor could enter a field to collect three times a day — in the morning, at midday, and in the afternoon. Rabban Gamliel taught that they said this only so that landowners should not reduce the number of times that the poor could enter. Rabbi Akiva taught that they said this only so that landowners should not increase the number of times that the poor had to enter. The landowners of Beit Namer used to harvest along a rope and allowed the poor to collect a corner from every row.

If the cluster had a shoulder or a dangling portion, it belonged to the property owner, but if there was a doubt, it belonged to the poor. A cluster that was attached to the joint between branches or the stem and the trunk, if it was plucked with the grape cluster, it belonged to the property owner; if not, it belonged to the poor. Rabbi Judah said that a single-grape cluster was a cluster, but the Sages said that it was a defective cluster (and thus belonged to the poor).

And for those who do not give to the poor, it is accounted to them as if the Temple existed and they did not offer up their sacrifices in it.

Deuteronomy chapter 25

Interpreting the laws of Levirite marriage (yibbum) under , the Gemara read  to address a Hebrew slave who married the Master's Canaanite slave, and deduced from  that the children of such a marriage were also considered Canaanite slaves and thus that their lineage flowed from their mother, not their father.

The Gemara interpreted  to teach that both one's wealth and one's necessities depend on one's honesty.

Reading , Rabbi Levi taught that blessed actions bless those who are responsible for them, and cursed actions curse those who are responsible for them. Conversely, the Midrash read  to teach, "You shall not have (possessions if there are) in your bag diverse weights, a great and a small. You shall not have (possessions if there are) in your house diverse measures, a great and a small." Thus, if one does employ deceitful measures, one will not have anything to take or give, to buy or sell. The Midrash taught that God tells businesspeople that they "may not make" one measure great and another small, but if they do, they "will not make" a profit.

Rabbi Levi taught that the punishment for false weights or measures (discussed at ) was more severe than that for having intimate relations with forbidden relatives (discussed at ). For in discussing the case of forbidden relatives,  uses the Hebrew word , eil, for the word "these," whereas in the case of false weights or measures,  uses the Hebrew word , eileh, for the word "these" (and the additional , eh at the end of the word implies additional punishment.) The Gemara explained that the punishments for giving false measures are greater than those for having relations with forbidden relatives because for forbidden relatives, repentance is possible (as long as there have not been children), but with false measure, repentance is impossible (as one cannot remedy the sin of robbery by mere repentance; the return of the things robbed must precede it, and in the case of false measures, it is practically impossible to find out all the members of the public who have been defrauded).

But a Midrash noted that  already mentioned judgment in law, and questioned why  would state the same proposition again and why  uses the words, "in judgment, in measures." The Midrash deduced that  teaches that a person who measures is called a judge, and one who falsifies measurements is called by the five names "unrighteous," "hated," "repulsive," "accursed," and an "abomination," and is the cause of these five evils. Rabbi Banya said in the name of Rav Huna that the government comes and attacks that generation whose measures are false. Reading , "Shall I be pure with wicked balances?" Rabbi Berekiah said in the name of Rabbi Abba that it is impossible for a generation whose measures are false to be meritorious, for  continues, "And with a bag of deceitful weights" (showing that their holdings would be merely illusory). Rabbi Levi taught that Moses also hinted to Israel that a generation with false measures would be attacked.  warns, "You shall not have in your bag diverse weights . . . you shall not have in your house diverse measures."

Rabbi Nehorai, on the other hand, said that  did not command the Israelites to choose a king, but was spoken only in anticipation of the Israelites’ future complaints, as  says, "And (you) shall say, ‘I will set a king over me.’"

In medieval Jewish interpretation
The parashah is discussed in these medieval Jewish sources:

Deuteronomy chapter 22

Reading , Maimonides taught that if a person sees a lost object and the person's father says not to return it, the person should return it instead of obeying the person's father. Maimonides said that the mention of “All” in  includes the devastation of property.

In the first instance, it is in itself a good feature in a person's character. Secondly, its benefit is mutual: For if a person does not return the lost property of another, nobody will restore to the person what the person may lose, just as those who do not honor their parents cannot expect to be honored by their children.

The Sefer ha-Chinuch argued that with this commandment in place, beasts and vessels will be safe anywhere in the holy land as if they were under the hand of their owners.

Nachmanides noted that  says “your brother’s,” while the parallel commandment in  states “your enemy’s” and  says “of him who hates you.” Nachmanides taught that Scripture thus means to say, “Do this for him (in assisting him), and remember the brotherhood between you and forget the hatred.”

Bahya concluded that  thus promises that if you assist your enemy with his falling donkey, he will eventually appreciate you and become “your brother.” When you assist him, he will forget the “hatred” between you and only remember the bond of love that unites brothers. Bahya taught that there is more to the commandment to restore lost property than merely the act of restoring it. If one is in a position to perform a useful service for one's fellow and to thereby protect one's fellow against loss, this is part of the commandment. Bahya also found in  encouragement regarding the resurrection, reading that God will practice this commandment personally by restoring the souls of the departed bodies to their original owners after the arrival of the Messiah. Noting that  continues, “You must not hide yourself,” Bahya found the moral lesson: Do not hide yourself from God, so that when the time comes, God will not hide from you.

Maimonides interpreted  to command that one should not unload the animal and depart, leaving the wayfarer in panic, but one should lift up the animal together with its owner, and reload the animal's burden on it. Maimonides taught that the general principle is that if the animal were one's own and one would unload and reload it, one is obligated to unload and reload it for a colleague. If one is pious and goes beyond the measure of the law, even if one is a great prince, and sees an animal belonging to a colleague fallen under a load of straw, reeds or the like, one should unload and load it with its owner. Thus, one must accompany the animal for a distance thereafter, unless the owner of the burden says that it is not necessary. Maimonides read  to obligate one when one sees the fallen animal in a way that can be described as an encounter, for  says, “When you see your colleague’s donkey,” and  says, “When you encounter . . . .” Maimonides taught that if one finds an animal belonging to a colleague fallen under its load, it is a commandment to unload and reload it even if its owner is not present, for the words “You shall certainly help” and “You shall certainly lift up” imply that one must fulfill these commandments in all situations. Maimonides said that  says “together with him” (that is, the animal's owner) to teach that if the owner of the animal was there and goes off to the side and relies on the passerby to unload it alone because the passerby is subject to a commandment, then the passerby is not obligated. If the owner of the animal is old or ailing, however, the passerby is obligated to load and unload the animal alone.

Maimonides taught that  enjoins that one should let the mother fly away when one takes the young to prevent pain to the mother bird. Maimonides argued that there is no difference between the pain of humans and animals. Maimonides concluded that if the Torah provides that we should not cause such grief to animals, how much more careful should we be not to cause grief to other people.

Rabbi David Kimchi stated that a parapet needed to be "ten hands high, or more, that a person might not fall from it".

Deuteronomy chapter 23
Maimonides used  to interpret how far to extend the principle of charity. Maimonides continued that the Law taught how far we have to extend this principle of treating kindly every one with whom we have some relationship — even if the other person offended or wronged us, even if the other person is very bad, we still must have some consideration for the other person. Thus  says: "You shall not abhor an Edomite, for he is your brother." And if we find a person in trouble, whose assistance we once enjoyed, or of whom we have received some benefit, even if that person has subsequently wronged us, we must bear in mind that person's previous good conduct. Thus  says: "You shall not abhor an Egyptian, because you were a stranger in his land," although the Egyptians subsequently oppressed the Israelites very much.

Deuteronomy chapter 25
Maimonides continued that if a creditor takes such collateral, it must be returned, even against the creditor's will. If the widow admits the debt, she must pay, but if she denies its existence, she must take an oath. If the security the creditor took was lost or consumed by fire before the creditor returned it, the creditor was punished by lashes.

In modern interpretation
The parashah is discussed in these modern sources:

Deuteronomy chapter 21
Professor Tamara Cohn Eskenazi of the Hebrew Union College-Jewish Institute of Religion cited , which describes a process by which a woman captured in war could become the wife of an Israelite man, as an example of intermarriage in the Torah, for although the text does not specify the woman's ethnic identity, the context implies that she was non-Israelite.

Rabbi David Wolpe of Sinai Temple said that although the law of the beautiful captive is barbaric by the ethical standards of the 21st century, it was ahead of its time by the ethical standards of antiquity. The law, according to Wolpe, indicates that the Torah distrusts people to control their sexual urges towards people over whom they hold power.

Deuteronomy chapter 22

Rabbi Donniel Hartman argued that  contains one of Judaism's central answers to the question of what is just and right, what he called “the religious ethic of nonindifference.”

Deuteronomy chapter 25
As well, in the wisdom perspective, history is the repository of eternal truths, lessons that never grow old, and thus Deuteronomy constantly urges its readers to "remember," as  does when it admonishes to "Remember what Amalek did to you." Kugel concluded that the Deuteronomist was closely connected to the world of wisdom literature.

In critical analysis
Some scholars who follow the Documentary Hypothesis consider all of the parashah to have been part of the original Deuteronomic Code (sometimes abbreviated Dtn) that the first Deuteronomistic historian (sometimes abbreviated Dtr 1) included in the edition of Deuteronomy that existed during Josiah’s time.

Commandments
According to the Sefer ha-Chinuch, there are 27 positive and 47 negative commandments in the parashah.
To keep the laws of the captive woman
Not to sell the captive woman into slavery
Not to retain the captive woman for servitude after having relations with her
The courts must hang those stoned for blasphemy or idolatry.
To bury the executed on the day that they die
Not to delay burial overnight
To return a lost object to its owner
Not to turn a blind eye to a lost object
Not to leave another's beast lying under its burden
To lift up a load for a Jew
Women must not wear men's clothing.
Men must not wear women's clothing.
Not to take the mother bird from her children
To release the mother bird if she was taken from the nest
To build a parapet
Not to leave a stumbling block about
Not to plant grains or greens in a vineyard
Not to eat diverse seeds planted in a vineyard
Not to do work with two kinds of animals together
Not to wear cloth of wool and linen
To marry a wife by means of ketubah and kiddushin
The slanderer must remain married to his wife.
The slanderer must not divorce his wife.
The court must have anyone who merits stoning stoned to death.
Not to punish anyone compelled to commit a transgression
The rapist must marry his victim if she chooses.
The rapist is not allowed to divorce his victim.
Not to let a eunuch marry into the Jewish people
Not to let the child of a prohibited union (mamzer) marry into the Jewish people
Not to let Moabite and Ammonite men marry into the Jewish people
Not to ever offer peace to Moab or Ammon
Not to exclude a third generation Edomite convert from marrying into the Jewish people
To exclude Egyptian converts from marrying into the Jewish people only for the first two generations
A ritually unclean person should not enter the camp of the Levites.
To prepare a place of easement in a camp
To prepare a boring-stick or spade for easement in a camp
Not to return a slave who fled into Israel from his master abroad
Not to oppress a slave who fled into Israel from his master abroad
Not to have relations with women not married by means of ketubah and kiddushin
Not to bring the wage of a harlot or the exchange price of a dog as a holy offering
Not to borrow at interest from a Jew
To lend at interest to a non-Jew if the non-Jew needs a loan, but not to a Jew
Not to be tardy with vowed and voluntary offerings
To fulfill whatever goes out from one's mouth
To allow a hired worker to eat certain foods while under hire
That a hired hand should not raise a sickle to another's standing grain
That a hired hand is forbidden to eat from the employer's crops during work
To issue a divorce by means of a get document
A man must not remarry his ex-wife after she has married someone else.
Not to demand from the bridegroom any involvement, communal or military during the first year
To give him who has taken a wife, built a new home, or planted a vineyard a year to rejoice therewith
Not to demand as collateral utensils needed for preparing food
The metzora must not remove his signs of impurity.
The creditor must not forcibly take collateral.
Not to delay return of collateral when needed
To return the collateral to the debtor when needed
To pay wages on the day that they were earned
Relatives of the litigants must not testify.
A judge must not pervert a case involving a convert or orphan.
Not to demand collateral from a widow
To leave the forgotten sheaves in the field
Not to retrieve the forgotten sheaves
The precept of whiplashes for the wicked
The court must not exceed the prescribed number of lashes.
Not to muzzle an ox while plowing
The widow must not remarry until the ties with her brother-in-law are removed.
To marry a childless brother's widow (to do yibum)
To free a widow from yibum (to do , chalitzah)
To save someone being pursued by a killer, even by taking the life of the pursuer
To have no mercy on a pursuer with intent to kill
Not to possess inaccurate scales and weights even if they are not for use
To remember what Amalek did to the Jewish people
To wipe out the descendants of Amalek
Not to forget Amalek's atrocities and ambush on the Israelites’ journey from Egypt in the desert

In the liturgy
The parashah is reflected in these parts of the Jewish liturgy:

The Weekly Maqam

In the Weekly Maqam, Sephardi Jews each week base the songs of the services on the content of that week's parashah. For Parashah Ki Teitzei, Sephardi Jews apply Maqam Saba. Saba, in Hebrew, literally means "army." It is appropriate here, because the parashah commences with the discussion of what to do in certain cases of war with the army.

Haftarah
The haftarah is the fifth in the cycle of seven haftarot of consolation after Tisha B'Av, leading up to Rosh Hashanah.

Notes

Further reading
The parashah has parallels or is discussed in these sources:

Biblical
 (Amalekites);  (two wives, one loved and one unloved);  (Amalek);  (Amalek);  (levirate marriage).
 (Amalek);  (punishing children for fathers’ sin),  (vows);  (restoring a pledged garment);  (the priests’ linen vestments);  (punishing children for fathers’ sin);  (making the priests’ linen vestments).
 (vows);  (priest wearing linen);  (high priest wearing linen);  (vows);  (paying what is due by sundown);  (just balances, weights, and measures).
 (punishing children for fathers’ sin);  (vows).
 (5:9 in NJPS) (punishing children for fathers’ sin);  (no capital punishment of children for fathers’ sin).
1 Samuel  (priest wearing linen);  (priests wearing linen).
 (David wearing linen in worship).
 (favoring the son of the favored wife over the firstborn in inheritance).
 (holy man clad in linen);  (not punishing children for fathers’ sin);  (the just restore pledges);  (priests wearing linen).
 (levirate marriage).
 (Agagite read as Amalekite via ).
 (holy man clad in linen);  (holy man clad in linen).
Psalms  (lending without interest);  (the wicked do not fear God);  (daughter, forget your father's house);  (performing vows);  (performing vows);  (counted for righteousness);  (God's mercies over all God's works).
 (David and Levites wearing linen in worship).
 (Levites wearing linen in worship).

Ancient
Law Code of Gortyn. Columns 7–8. Crete, circa 480–450 BCE. In, e.g., Adonis S. Vasilakis. The Great Inscription of the Law Code of Gortyn. Heraklion, Greece: Mystis O.E. (marriage of an heiress).

Early nonrabbinic
Josephus, Antiquities of the Jews book 4, chapter 8, paragraphs 9, 11, 20–21, 23–27, 29, 38–44 . Circa 93–94. In, e.g., The Works of Josephus: Complete and Unabridged, New Updated Edition. Translated by William Whiston, pages 116–24. Peabody, Massachusetts: Hendrickson Publishers, 1987.
Gaius Julius Hyginus. Fabulae 95. 1st–2nd century CE. (reporting the myth of how Odysseus (Ulysses) plowed with ox and horse together to show himself insane).
Quran 2:275; 3:130. Arabia, 7th century. (Islam's parallel prohibition of interest, or riba).

Classical rabbinic
Mishnah: Peah 1:1–8:9; Kilayim 1:1–9:10; Sheviit 10:2; Terumot 8:1; 9:3; Shekalim 1:1; Megillah 3:4; Yevamot 1:1–16:7; Ketubot 3:1–4:1, 3; Nedarim 1:1–11:11; Sotah 6:3; 7:2, 4; 8:4; Gittin 1:1–9:10; Bava Kamma 5:7; 8:1; Bava Metzia 1:1–2:11; 9:11–13; Bava Batra 8:4–5; Sanhedrin 1:1–3; 2:1; 6:4; 7:9; 8:1–7; 11:1; Makkot 3:1–16; Shevuot 1:1–8:6; Chullin 12:1–5; Bekhorot 8:7, 9; Arakhin 3:1, 4–5; Temurah 6:3–4; Parah 2:3; Yadayim 4:4. Land of Israel, circa 200 CE. In, e.g., The Mishnah: A New Translation. Translated by Jacob Neusner, pages 14–36, 49–68, 91, 110, 113, 251, 321, 337–78, 381–85, 406–30, 457, 461, 466–87, 515, 520, 528–34, 554–55, 574–75, 583, 585, 595, 599–602, 607, 616–39, 785–807, 812–13, 834, 1014–15, 1129. New Haven: Yale University Press, 1988.
Sifre to Deuteronomy 211:1–296:6. Land of Israel, circa 250–350 CE. In, e.g., Sifre to Deuteronomy: An Analytical Translation. Translated by Jacob Neusner, volume 2, pages 111–266. Atlanta: Scholars Press, 1987.
Tosefta: Berakhot 5:14; Peah 1:1–4:21; Kilayim 1:1–5:27; Maasrot 3:12; Megillah 3:2, 25; Yevamot 1:1–14:10; Ketubot 3:1–4:1; Nedarim 1:1–7:8; Sotah 5:9; 7:20; Gittin 1:1–7:13; Kiddushin 5:4; Bava Kamma 8:10; Bava Metzia 1:1–2:33; 8:7; 10:3, 8, 10–11; Bava Batra 5:7; Sanhedrin 4:1; 7:4; 9:7; Makkot 1:7; 5:14, 17; Shevuot 1:1–6:7; Bekhorot 6:1; Negaim 1:7; 3:2; 6:2; Parah 2:2; Yadayim 2:17. Land of Israel, circa 250 CE. In, e.g., The Tosefta: Translated from the Hebrew, with a New Introduction. Translated by Jacob Neusner, volume 1, pages 31, 61, 65, 75, 292, 644, 650, 707, 720, 725, 731, 752, 785–805, 852, 866, 899–901, 920, 943; volume 2, pages 997, 1023–30, 1067, 1084, 1086, 1115, 1155, 1169, 1177, 1201, 1218–44, 1486, 1711, 1717, 1730, 1748, 1908. Peabody, Massachusetts: Hendrickson Publishers, 2002.
Jerusalem Talmud: Berakhot 54b, 59b; Peah 1a–73b; Demai 14a; Kilayim 1a–84b; Terumot 2a, 8a, 12a, 32a, 62a–63b; Maasrot 19a–20a; Challah 8b, 16a; Orlah 20a; Bikkurim 6b; Shabbat 24a, 79a, 86a; Eruvin 35a; Pesachim 13b; Yoma 41b, 53b; Rosh Hashanah 3b, 5b; Moed Katan 14a; Chagigah 1b, 10b; Yevamot 1a–88b; Ketubot 16b, 17b–18b, 20b–22a, 23b, 24b–25a, 26a–27a, 28a, 29a, 30a; Nedarim 1a–42b; Nazir 21a, 29a, 36a–b, 38a; Sotah 1a–b, 6b–7a, 10a, 11b, 12b–13a, 19b–20a, 28b, 30a, 32a, 41b–42a, 43a, 45a; Gittin 1a–53b; Kiddushin 1a–b, 2b, 4b, 5b, 11a, 16b, 21b–22a; Bava Kamma 22b, 27a, 31a; Bava Metzia 1a–8b, 26b–27a, 32b–33b; Bava Batra 19a, 26a, 27a; Sanhedrin 22a–23a, 35b, 36b, 43b–44a, 49a–b, 50b–52b, 55b, 57a, 62b, 70a–71a, 75a; Makkot 1a, 8b, 11a; Shevuot 1a–49a; Avodah Zarah 1a. Tiberias, Land of Israel, circa 400 CE. In, e.g., Talmud Yerushalmi. Edited by Chaim Malinowitz, Yisroel Simcha Schorr, and Mordechai Marcus, volumes 2–5, 7–9, 11–13, 15, 17–18, 21, 24, 27–31, 33–35, 37–47, 49. Brooklyn: Mesorah Publications, 2006–2020. And in, e.g., The Jerusalem Talmud: A Translation and Commentary. Edited by Jacob Neusner and translated by Jacob Neusner, Tzvee Zahavy, B. Barry Levy, and Edward Goldman. Peabody, Massachusetts: Hendrickson Publishers, 2009.
Genesis Rabbah 17:7; 19:12; 20:7; 41:3; 43:9; 45:6; 48:16; 52:2, 5; 55:3; 61:7; 63:12; 65:2; 74:7, 15; 76:6; 81:2; 84:16; 85:5; 87:5; 94:9; 99:2. Land of Israel, 5th century. In, e.g., Midrash Rabbah: Genesis. Translated by Harry Freedman and Maurice Simon, volume 1, pages 137–38, 157–58, 165–66, 334–35, 358–59, 384, 416, 451, 453, 483; volume 2, pages 545–46, 567, 581, 680, 686–87, 705–06, 745–46, 781–82, 792, 808, 879, 975. London: Soncino Press, 1939.
Leviticus Rabbah 24:7. Land of Israel, 5th century. In, e.g., Midrash Rabbah: Leviticus. Translated by Harry Freedman and Maurice Simon, volume 4, pages 309–10. London: Soncino Press, 1939.

Babylonian Talmud: Berakhot 7a, 19b, 21b–22a, 25a–b, 28a, 33b, 35a, 55b, 63b; Shabbat 15a, 23a, 25b, 27a, 29b, 32a, 50b, 54a, 56a, 66a, 132b–33a, 136a, 139a, 144b, 150a; Eruvin 13b, 15b; Pesachim 3a, 25a–b, 26b, 31b, 41b, 68a, 72b, 90a, 98a, 116b; Yoma 13b, 36a, 67b, 74b, 81a, 82a; Sukkah 9a, 24b, 29a; Beitzah 3b, 8b, 14b, 19b, 24b, 36b; Rosh Hashanah 4a, 5b–6b; Taanit 6b; Megillah 3b, 6b–7b, 8a, 18a, 25a, 29a; Moed Katan 2a–b, 4b, 8b, 9b, 14b, 18b, 21a, 25b; Chagigah 2b, 3b–4a, 15a, 16b; Yevamot 2a–122b; Ketubot 2b, 5a, 6b, 7b, 9a, 10a–11b, 22a, 29a–41b, 42b–43a, 44a–47a, 48b–49a, 51b, 53b–54a, 66a, 72a, 74a, 77a–b, 80a, 82a–b; Nedarim 2a–91b; Nazir 2a, 23b, 30b, 37a, 41b, 58a, 59a, 66a; Sotah 2b, 3b, 5b, 9a, 16a, 18b, 20b–21b, 23a–25a, 26b, 31b, 33a, 35b, 43a–45a; Gittin 2a–90b; Kiddushin 2a–b, 3b–5a, 6a, 7a, 8b, 9a–10a, 11b, 13b–14a, 21b, 23a, 24b, 29b, 33b–34a, 40a, 41a, 44a, 51a, 56b, 63a–64a, 65b, 67a–69a, 70a, 72b, 74a, 75a, 76a–77a, 78a–b; Bava Kamma 4b–5a, 8a, 15b, 25a, 27a, 28a–b, 38b, 42a, 43a, 46a, 51a, 54a–b, 57a, 65b, 70b, 80b, 81b–82a, 83b–84a, 86b–87a, 88a, 92b, 100a, 110b, 113b; Bava Metzia 2a–33b, 48a, 54a, 56b, 60b–61a, 66a, 70b, 75b, 82a, 83a–93a, 102a, 110b–11b, 113a, 114a–15a; Bava Batra 2b, 11a, 12b, 16b, 19b, 21b, 36a, 45b, 55a, 72b, 74a, 82b, 88b–89a, 108b, 110b, 111b, 113b, 116b, 119b, 122b–23a, 124a–b, 126b–27b, 130a–b, 134a, 142b, 144b, 155b–56a, 168a, 175b; Sanhedrin 2a, 7b, 8b–9a, 10a, 18a–19a, 21a, 27b–28a, 31b, 33b, 34b, 35b, 36b, 41a, 44a, 45a–47b, 49a–50b, 51b, 53a, 54b, 56b–57a, 59b, 65b, 66b, 68b–75a, 82a, 85b–86a, 103b, 105b–06a, 107a; Makkot 2a–b, 4b–5b, 8b, 10b, 13a–24b; Shevuot 2a–49b; Avodah Zarah 17a, 20a, 26b, 37a, 46b, 54a, 62b; Horayot 10b, 12b; Zevachim 2a, 4b, 7b, 18b, 24b, 27b, 29a, 72a, 88a; Menachot 2a, 5b–6a, 10a, 15b, 32a–b, 39a–41a, 43a–44a, 50a, 58a–b, 69b, 90b, 101a, 103a; Chullin 2a, 11a, 26b, 48a, 62b, 68a, 74b, 78b, 83b, 87a, 109b, 115a–16a, 120a–b, 130b–31b, 136a–b, 138b–42a; Bekhorot 13a, 17a, 19b, 46a–b, 47b, 49b, 52a–b, 56a–57a; Arakhin 3b, 6a, 7a, 13b, 14b–15a, 19b, 25b; Temurah 4b–5a, 6a, 29b–30b, 33b; Keritot 2a, 3a, 14b–15a, 17b, 21a–b; Meilah 13a, 18a; Niddah 23b, 26a, 32a, 43a, 44a–b, 49b, 50b–51a, 52a, 55b, 61b, 69b–70a. Sasanian Empire, 6th century. In, e.g., Talmud Bavli. Edited by Yisroel Simcha Schorr, Chaim Malinowitz, and Mordechai Marcus, 72 volumes. Brooklyn: Mesorah Pubs., 2006.

Medieval

Deuteronomy Rabbah 6:1–14. Land of Israel, 9th century. In, e.g., Midrash Rabbah: Leviticus. Translated by Harry Freedman and Maurice Simon. London: Soncino Press, 1939.
Rashi. Commentary. Deuteronomy 21–25. Troyes, France, late 11th century. In, e.g., Rashi. The Torah: With Rashi’s Commentary Translated, Annotated, and Elucidated. Translated and annotated by Yisrael Isser Zvi Herczeg, volume 5, pages 221–65. Brooklyn: Mesorah Publications, 1997.

Rashbam. Commentary on the Torah. Troyes, early 12th century. In, e.g., Rashbam’s Commentary on Deuteronomy: An Annotated Translation. Edited and translated by Martin I. Lockshin, pages 129–45. Providence, Rhode Island: Brown Judaic Studies, 2004.
Judah Halevi. Kuzari. 2:58; 3:35. Toledo, Spain, 1130–1140. In, e.g., Jehuda Halevi. Kuzari: An Argument for the Faith of Israel. Introduction by Henry Slonimsky, pages 119, 168. New York: Schocken, 1964.
Second Council of the Lateran. Rome, 1139. (usury forbidden).
Abraham ibn Ezra. Commentary on the Torah. Mid-12th century. In, e.g., Ibn Ezra's Commentary on the Pentateuch: Deuteronomy (Devarim). Translated and annotated by H. Norman Strickman and Arthur M. Silver, volume 5, pages 143–87. New York: Menorah Publishing Company, 2001.

Maimonides. Mishneh Torah: Hilchot Gezelah Va'Avedah (The Laws of Robery and Lost Property), chapter 11; Hilchot Rotze’ach USh’mirat Nefesh (The Laws of Murder and the Protection of Human Life), chapter 13. Egypt, circa 1170–1180. In, e.g., Mishneh Torah: Sefer Nezikin: The Book of Damages. Translated by Eliyahu Touger, pages 330–43, 596–607. New York: Moznaim Publishing, 1997.
Maimonides. Mishneh Torah: Hilchot Malveh V’Loveh (The Laws Pertaining to Lenders and Borrowers), chapter 3, halachah 1. In, e.g., Mishneh Torah: Sefer Mishpatim: The Book of Judgments. Translated by Eliyahu Touger, pages 224–27. New York: Moznaim Publishing, 2000.
Maimonides. The Guide for the Perplexed, part 3, chapter 42. Cairo, Egypt, 1190. In, e.g., Moses Maimonides. The Guide for the Perplexed. Translated by Michael Friedländer, pages 351–52. New York: Dover Publications, 1956.
Hezekiah ben Manoah. Hizkuni. France, circa 1240. In, e.g., Chizkiyahu ben Manoach. Chizkuni: Torah Commentary. Translated and annotated by Eliyahu Munk, volume 4, pages 1147–77. Jerusalem: Ktav Publishers, 2013.
Midrash ha-Ne'lam (The Midrash of the Concealed). Spain, 13th century. In Zohar Chadash, pages 59a–c. Salonika, 1587. In, e.g., The Zohar: Pritzker Edition. Translation and commentary by Nathan Wolski, volume 10, pages 525–37. Stanford, California: Stanford University Press, 2016.

Naḥmanides. Commentary on the Torah. Jerusalem, circa 1270. In, e.g., Ramban (Nachmanides): Commentary on the Torah: Deuteronomy. Translated by Charles B. Chavel, volume 5, pages 247–306. New York: Shilo Publishing House, 1976.
Dante Alighieri. Inferno. Cantos XI, XVII. Italy, early 14th century. (usurer's demise).
Bahya ben Asher. Commentary on the Torah. Spain, early 14th century. In, e.g., Midrash Rabbeinu Bachya: Torah Commentary by Rabbi Bachya ben Asher. Translated and annotated by Eliyahu Munk, volume 7, pages 2610–78. Jerusalem: Lambda Publishers, 2003.
Isaac ben Moses Arama. Akedat Yizhak (The Binding of Isaac). Late 15th century. In, e.g., Yitzchak Arama. Akeydat Yitzchak: Commentary of Rabbi Yitzchak Arama on the Torah. Translated and condensed by Eliyahu Munk, volume 2, pages 864–81. New York, Lambda Publishers, 2001.

Modern

Isaac Abravanel. Commentary on the Torah. Italy, between 1492 and 1509. In, e.g., Abarbanel: Selected Commentaries on the Torah: Volume 5: Devarim/Deuteronomy. Translated and annotated by Israel Lazar, pages 107–28. Brooklyn: CreateSpace, 2015.
Martin Luther. Long Sermon on Usury. Germany, 1520.
Martin Luther. On Trade and Usury. Germany, 1524.
Obadiah ben Jacob Sforno. Commentary on the Torah. Venice, 1567. In, e.g., Sforno: Commentary on the Torah. Translation and explanatory notes by Raphael Pelcovitz, pages 934–53. Brooklyn: Mesorah Publications, 1997.
Moshe Alshich. Commentary on the Torah. Safed, circa 1593. In, e.g., Moshe Alshich. Midrash of Rabbi Moshe Alshich on the Torah. Translated and annotated by Eliyahu Munk, volume 3, pages 1063–85. New York, Lambda Publishers, 2000.

Francis Bacon. "Of Usury." England, 1612. (Usurers violated the injunction that man live by the sweat of his brow.)
Avraham Yehoshua Heschel. Commentaries on the Torah. Cracow, Poland, mid 17th century. Compiled as Chanukat HaTorah. Edited by Chanoch Henoch Erzohn. Piotrkow, Poland, 1900. In Avraham Yehoshua Heschel. Chanukas HaTorah: Mystical Insights of Rav Avraham Yehoshua Heschel on Chumash. Translated by Avraham Peretz Friedman, pages 308–11. Southfield, Michigan: Targum Press/Feldheim Publishers, 2004.

Thomas Hobbes. Leviathan, Review & Conclusion. England, 1651. Reprint edited by C. B. Macpherson, page 724. Harmondsworth, England: Penguin Classics, 1982.
Chaim ibn Attar. Ohr ha-Chaim. Venice, 1742. In Chayim ben Attar. Or Hachayim: Commentary on the Torah. Translated by Eliyahu Munk, volume 5, pages 1905–35. Brooklyn: Lambda Publishers, 1999.

Pope Benedict XIV. Vix pervenit: On Usury and Other Dishonest Profit. 1745.
Moses Mendelssohn. Jerusalem, § 2. Berlin, 1783. In Jerusalem: Or on Religious Power and Judaism. Translated by Allan Arkush; introduction and commentary by Alexander Altmann, page 129. Hanover, N.H.: Brandeis Univ. Press, 1983.

Jeremy Bentham. Defence of Usury. London, 1787.
Samuel David Luzzatto (Shadal). Commentary on the Torah. Padua, 1871. In, e.g., Samuel David Luzzatto. Torah Commentary. Translated and annotated by Eliyahu Munk, volume 4, pages 1222–46. New York: Lambda Publishers, 2012.

Yehudah Aryeh Leib Alter. Sefat Emet. Góra Kalwaria (Ger), Poland, before 1906. Excerpted in The Language of Truth: The Torah Commentary of Sefat Emet. Translated and interpreted by Arthur Green, pages 315–21. Philadelphia: Jewish Publication Society, 1998. Reprinted 2012.
Hermann Cohen. Religion of Reason: Out of the Sources of Judaism. Translated with an introduction by Simon Kaplan; introductory essays by Leo Strauss, pages 53, 120, 125, 151–52, 154, 431. New York: Ungar, 1972. Reprinted Atlanta: Scholars Press, 1995. Originally published as Religion der Vernunft aus den Quellen des Judentums. Leipzig: Gustav Fock, 1919.

Abraham Isaac Kook. The Lights of Penitence, 14:33. 1925. In Abraham Isaac Kook: the Lights of Penitence, the Moral Principles, Lights of Holiness, Essays, Letters, and Poems. Translated by Ben Zion Bokser, page 108. Mahwah, N.J.: Paulist Press 1978.
H. G. Wells. “Serfs, Slaves, Social Classes and Free Individuals.” In The Outline of History: Being a Plain History of Life and Mankind, pages 254–59. New York: The Macmillan Company, 1920. Revised edition Doubleday and Company, 1971.
Alexander Alan Steinbach. Sabbath Queen: Fifty-four Bible Talks to the Young Based on Each Portion of the Pentateuch, pages 155–57. New York: Behrman's Jewish Book House, 1936.
Joseph Reider. The Holy Scriptures: Deuteronomy with Commentary, pages 198–236. Philadelphia: Jewish Publication Society, 1937.
Thomas Mann. Joseph and His Brothers. Translated by John E. Woods, pages 55–56, 269–71. New York: Alfred A. Knopf, 2005. Originally published as Joseph und seine Brüder. Stockholm: Bermann-Fischer Verlag, 1943.
Isaac Mendelsohn. "Slavery in the Ancient Near East." Biblical Archaeologist. Volume 9 (1946): pages 74–88.
Isaac Mendelsohn. Slavery in the Ancient Near East. New York: Oxford University Press, 1949.
Morris Adler. The World of the Talmud, pages 26–27, 71. B'nai B'rith Hillel Foundations, 1958. Reprinted Kessinger Publishing, 2007.

Martin Buber. On the Bible: Eighteen studies, pages 80–92. New York: Schocken Books, 1968.
Thomas Thompson and Dorothy Thompson. “Some Legal Problems in the Book of Ruth.” Vetus Testamentum, volume 18 (number 1) (January 1968): pages 79–99. (discussing issues related to Levirate marriage in ).
John R. Bartlett. “The Brotherhood of Edom.” Journal for the Study of the Old Testament, volume 2 (number 4) (February 1977): pages 2–27..
Calum M. Carmichael. “A Ceremonial Crux: Removing a Man's Sandal as a Female Gesture of Contempt.”, Journal of Biblical Literature, volume 96, (number 3) (September 1977): pages 321–36.
Nehama Leibowitz. Studies in Devarim: Deuteronomy, pages 209–56. Jerusalem: The World Zionist Organization, 1980.
Pinchas H. Peli. Torah Today: A Renewed Encounter with Scripture, pages 221–24. Washington, D.C.: B'nai B'rith Books, 1987.
Ben Zion Bergman. "A Question of Great Interest: May a Synagogue Issue Interest-Bearing Bonds?" New York: Rabbinical Assembly, 1988. YD 167:1.1988a. In Responsa: 1980–1990: The Committee on Jewish Law and Standards of the Conservative Movement. Edited by David J. Fine, pages 319–23. New York: Rabbinical Assembly, 2005.
Avram Israel Reisner. "Dissent: A Matter of Great Interest" New York: Rabbinical Assembly, 1988. YD 167:1.1988b. In Responsa: 1980–1990: The Committee on Jewish Law and Standards of the Conservative Movement. Edited by David J. Fine, pages 324–28. New York: Rabbinical Assembly, 2005.
Patrick D. Miller. Deuteronomy, pages 163–77. Louisville: John Knox Press, 1990.
Mark S. Smith. The Early History of God: Yahweh and the Other Deities in Ancient Israel, pages 2, 28. New York: HarperSanFrancisco, 1990..
A Song of Power and the Power of Song: Essays on the Book of Deuteronomy. Edited by Duane L. Christensen. Winona Lake, Indiana: Eisenbrauns, 1993.
Aaron Wildavsky. Assimilation versus Separation: Joseph the Administrator and the Politics of Religion in Biblical Israel, pages 3–4. New Brunswick, N.J.: Transaction Publishers, 1993.
Judith S. Antonelli. "The Captured Woman." In In the Image of God: A Feminist Commentary on the Torah, pages 455–70. Northvale, New Jersey: Jason Aronson, 1995.
David Frankel. "The Deuteronomic Portrayal of Balaam." Vetus Testamentum, volume 46 (number 1) (January 1996): pages 30–42.
Ellen Frankel. The Five Books of Miriam: A Woman’s Commentary on the Torah, pages 271–85. New York: G. P. Putnam's Sons, 1996.
Marc Gellman. God’s Mailbox: More Stories About Stories in the Bible, pages 90–98. New York: Morrow Junior Books, 1996.
Jack R. Lundbom. "The Inclusio and Other Framing Devices in Deuteronomy I–XXVIII." Vetus Testamentum, volume 46 (number 3) (July 1996): pages 296–315.

W. Gunther Plaut. The Haftarah Commentary, pages 482–88. New York: UAHC Press, 1996.
Judith Hauptman. “Divorce” and “Rape and Seduction.” In Rereading the Rabbis: A Woman's Voice, pages 77–129. Boulder, Colorado: Westview Press, 1997.
Sorel Goldberg Loeb and Barbara Binder Kadden. Teaching Torah: A Treasury of Insights and Activities, pages 322–28. Denver: A.R.E. Publishing, 1997.
Judith Gary Brown. "The Accused Woman." In The Women's Torah Commentary: New Insights from Women Rabbis on the 54 Weekly Torah Portions. Edited by Elyse Goldstein, pages 364–70. Woodstock, Vermont: Jewish Lights Publishing, 2000.
Richard D. Nelson. "Deuteronomy." In The HarperCollins Bible Commentary. Edited by James L. Mays, pages 206–08. New York: HarperCollins Publishers, revised edition, 2000.
Joseph Telushkin. The Book of Jewish Values: A Day-by-Day Guide to Ethical Living, pages 4–6. New York: Bell Tower, 2000.
Walter Brueggemann. Abingdon Old Testament Commentaries: Deuteronomy, pages 207–45. Nashville: Abingdon Press, 2001.
Timothy M. Willis. The Elders of the City: A Study of the Elders-Laws in Deuteronomy. Atlanta: Society of Biblical Literature, 2001.
Lainie Blum Cogan and Judy Weiss. Teaching Haftarah: Background, Insights, and Strategies, pages 324–26. Denver: A.R.E. Publishing, 2002.
Michael Fishbane. The JPS Bible Commentary: Haftarot, pages 301–04. Philadelphia: Jewish Publication Society, 2002.
Alan Lew. This Is Real and You Are Completely Unprepared: The Days of Awe as a Journey of Transformation, pages 65, 85–92. Boston: Little, Brown and Co., 2003.
Joseph Telushkin. The Ten Commandments of Character: Essential Advice for Living an Honorable, Ethical, Honest Life, pages 94–97. New York: Bell Tower, 2003.
Robert Alter. The Five Books of Moses: A Translation with Commentary, pages 981–1003. New York: W.W. Norton & Co., 2004.
Bernard M. Levinson. "Deuteronomy." In The Jewish Study Bible. Edited by Adele Berlin and Marc Zvi Brettler, pages 414–23. New York: Oxford University Press, 2004.
Professors on the Parashah: Studies on the Weekly Torah Reading Edited by Leib Moscovitz, pages 328–39. Jerusalem: Urim Publications, 2005.
Bruce Wells. "Sex, Lies, and Virginal Rape: The Slandered Bride and False Accusation in Deuteronomy." Journal of Biblical Literature, volume 124 (number 1) (Spring 2005): pages 41–72.
Judith Z. Abrams. "Misconceptions About Disabilities in the Hebrew Bible." In Jewish Perspectives on Theology and the Human Experience of Disability. Edited by Judith Z. Abrams & William C. Gaventa, pages 81–82. Binghamton, N.Y.: Haworth Pastoral Press, 2006.
Marc Cortez. “The Law on Violent Intervention: Deuteronomy 25.11–12 Revisited.” Journal for the Study of the Old Testament, volume 30 (number 4) (June 2006): pages 431–47.
W. Gunther Plaut. The Torah: A Modern Commentary: Revised Edition. Revised edition edited by David E.S. Stern, pages 1320–46. New York: Union for Reform Judaism, 2006.
Suzanne A. Brody. "Tsitsit." In Dancing in the White Spaces: The Yearly Torah Cycle and More Poems, page 107. Shelbyville, Kentucky: Wasteland Press, 2007.
James L. Kugel. How To Read the Bible: A Guide to Scripture, Then and Now, pages 64, 140, 175, 236, 261, 270, 278, 309–12, 395, 402–03, 407, 448–49, 579, 610. New York: Free Press, 2007.
Michael D. Matlock. “Obeying the First Part of the Tenth Commandment: Applications from the Levirate Marriage Law.” Journal for the Study of the Old Testament, volume 31 (number 3) (March 2007): pages 295–310.
Joseph Fleishman. “The Delinquent Daughter and Legal Innovation in Deuteronomy XXII 20–21.” Vetus Testamentum, volume 58 (number 2) (2008): pages 191–210.
The Torah: A Women's Commentary. Edited by Tamara Cohn Eskenazi and Andrea L. Weiss, pages 1165–90. New York: URJ Press, 2008.
Eugene E. Carpenter. "Deuteronomy." In Zondervan Illustrated Bible Backgrounds Commentary. Edited by John H. Walton, volume 1, pages 491–505. Grand Rapids, Michigan: Zondervan, 2009.
Reuven Hammer. Entering Torah: Prefaces to the Weekly Torah Portion, pages 281–85. New York: Gefen Publishing House, 2009.
Elliot Kukla and Reuben Zellman. "To Wear Is Human, to Live — Divine: Parashat Ki Tetse (Deuteronomy 21:10–25:19)." In Torah Queeries: Weekly Commentaries on the Hebrew Bible. Edited by Gregg Drinkwater, Joshua Lesser, and David Shneer; foreword by Judith Plaskow, pages 254–58. New York: New York University Press, 2009.
Meir Malul. “What is the Nature of the Crime of the Delinquent Daughter in Deuteronomy 22:13–21? A Rejoinder to J. Fleishman's Suggestion.” Vetus Testamentum, volume 59 (number 3) (2009): pages 446–59.
Dvora E. Weisberg. Levirate Marriage and the Family in Ancient Judaism. Waltham, Massachusetts: Brandeis University Press, 2009.
Jerry Z. Muller. "The Long Shadow of Usury." In Capitalism and the Jews, pages 15–71. Princeton: Princeton University Press, 2010.
Natan Slifkin. Shiluach haKein: The Transformation of a Mitzvah. Jerusalem: Lander Institute, 2010.
Marjorie Ingall. "Shatnez Shock: Pondering One of the Torah’s Woolliest Rules." Tablet Magazine. (July 19, 2010).
Young Hye Kim. “The Jubilee: Its Reckoning and Inception Day.” Vetus Testamentum, volume 60 (number 1) (2010): pages 147–51.
Bruce Wells. “The Hated Wife in Deuteronomic Law.” Vetus Testamentum, volume 60 (number 1) (2010): pages 131–46.
William G. Dever. The Lives of Ordinary People in Ancient Israel: When Archaeology and the Bible Intersect, pages 178, 188, 190, 192, 245. Grand Rapids, Michigan: William B. Eerdmans Publishing Company, 2012.
Jonathan Haidt. The Righteous Mind: Why Good People Are Divided by Politics and Religion, pages 13, 325 note 22. New York: Pantheon, 2012. (clothing made from different fibers).

Shmuel Herzfeld. "The Torah’s Attitude toward Behavior in War." In Fifty-Four Pick Up: Fifteen-Minute Inspirational Torah Lessons, pages 279–83. Jerusalem: Gefen Publishing House, 2012.
Stephen Beard. "Britain Wants To Be Hub for Sharia Banking." Marketplace. (July 18, 2013) (adaptation to Islam's parallel prohibition on charging interest).
Beth Kissileff. "Accept Responsibility: The refusal to hide ourselves from the needs of others has positive consequences." The Jerusalem Report, volume 24 (number 10) (August 26, 2013): page 45.
Eve Levavi Feinstein. “Restoration of Marriage (Deut 24:1–4).” In Sexual Pollution in the Hebrew Bible, pages 53–65. New York: Oxford University Press, 2014.
Edward Lipinski. "Cult Prostitution in Ancient Israel?" Biblical Archaeology Review, volume 40 (number 1) (January/February 2014): pages 48–56, 70.

Nicholas Kristof. "When Emily Was Sold for Sex." The New York Times. (February 13, 2014): page A27. (human trafficking in our time).
Shlomo Riskin. Torah Lights: Devarim: Moses Bequeaths Legacy, History, and Covenant, pages 203–68. New Milford, Connecticut: Maggid Books, 2014.
Gabriel Sanders. "The Biblical Side of ‘Saving Private Ryan’: Spielberg’s WWII epic alludes to Abraham Lincoln and Abraham the patriarch." Tablet Magazine. (July 1, 2014).
Walk Free Foundation. The Global Slavery Index 2014. Australia, 2014.
Pablo Diego-Rosell and Jacqueline Joudo Larsen. "35.8 Million Adults and Children in Slavery Worldwide." Gallup. (November 17, 2014).
Beverly Siegel. "Sign on the Dotted Line: To fight the chained-wife problem, more women are insisting on a special prenup." Tablet Magazine. (March 6, 2015).
Peter Kohn. "Court ruling eases Jewish divorce." Australian Jewish News. (March 9, 2015).
The Commentators' Bible: The Rubin JPS Miqra'ot Gedolot: Deuteronomy. Edited, translated, and annotated by Michael Carasik, pages 142–71. Philadelphia: Jewish Publication Society, 2015.

Jonathan Sacks. Lessons in Leadership: A Weekly Reading of the Jewish Bible, pages 269–73. New Milford, Connecticut: Maggid Books, 2015.
Atar Hadari. "For the Torah, Women Aren't Commodities, and Marriage Isn't a Pro-Forma Prelude to Sex: The point of the Torah’s rules on foreign brides and divorce." Mosaic Magazine. (September 15, 2016).
David Booth, Ashira Konigsburg, and Baruch Frydman-Kohl. “Modesty Inside and Out: A Contemporary Guide to Tzniut,” pages 7, 16. New York: Rabbinical Assembly, 2016. ( and modesty in dress).
Donniel Hartman. “You Are Your Brother’s Keeper: The Religious Ethic of Nonindifference.” In Putting God Second: How to Save Religion from Itself, pages 20–31. Boston: Beacon Press, 2016.
Jonathan Sacks. Essays on Ethics: A Weekly Reading of the Jewish Bible, pages 305–10. New Milford, Connecticut: Maggid Books, 2016.
Shai Held. The Heart of Torah, Volume 2: Essays on the Weekly Torah Portion: Leviticus, Numbers, and Deuteronomy, pages 250–59. Philadelphia: Jewish Publication Society, 2017.
Jeremy Kalmanofsky. “Alternative Kevura Methods.” New York: Rabbinical Assembly, 2017. (environmentally friendly burial practices as well as alternatives to burial including alkaline hydrolysis and promession in the light of ).
Steven Levy and Sarah Levy. The JPS Rashi Discussion Torah Commentary, pages 167–70. Philadelphia: Jewish Publication Society, 2017.
Caryn A. Reeder. “Deuteronomy 21.10–14 and/as Wartime Rape.” Journal for the Study of the Old Testament, volume 41 (number 3) (March 2017): pages 313–36.
Somini Sengupta. “End Marry-Your-Rapist Laws, Activists Say.
Pekka Pitkänen. “Ancient Israelite Population Economy: Ger, Toshav, Nakhri and Karat as Settler Colonial Categories.” Journal for the Study of the Old Testament, volume 42 (number 2) (December 2017): pages 139–53.
Ernst Wendland. Deuteronomy: translationNotes. Orlando, Florida: unfoldingWord, 2017.
Jonathan Sacks. Covenant & Conversation: A Weekly Reading of the Jewish Bible: Deuteronomy: Renewal of the Sinai Covenant, pages 181–217. New Milford, Connecticut: Maggid Books, 2019.
U.S. Department of State. Trafficking in Persons Report: June 2020. (slavery in the present day).

External links

Texts
Masoretic text and 1917 JPS translation
Hear the parashah chanted 
Hear the parashah read in Hebrew

Commentaries

Academy for Jewish Religion, New York
Aish.com
Akhlah: The Jewish Children’s Learning Network
Aleph Beta Academy
American Jewish University — Ziegler School of Rabbinic Studies
Anshe Emes Synagogue, Los Angeles 
Ari Goldwag
Ascent of Safed
Bar-Ilan University
Chabad.org
eparsha.com
G-dcast
The Israel Koschitzky Virtual Beit Midrash
Jewish Agency for Israel
Jewish Theological Seminary
Kabbala Online
Mechon Hadar
MyJewishLearning.com
Ohr Sameach
Orthodox Union
OzTorah, Torah from Australia
Oz Ve Shalom — Netivot Shalom
Pardes from Jerusalem
Professor James L. Kugel
Professor Michael Carasik
Rabbi Fabian Werbin
Rabbi Jonathan Sacks
Rabbi Shlomo Riskin
Rabbi Shmuel Herzfeld
Rabbi Stan Levin
Reconstructionist Judaism 
Sephardic Institute
Shiur.com
613.org Jewish Torah Audio
Tanach Study Center
Teach613.org, Torah Education at Cherry Hill
TheTorah.com
Torah from Dixie
Torah.org
TorahVort.com
Union for Reform Judaism
United Synagogue of Conservative Judaism
What’s Bothering Rashi?
Yeshivat Chovevei Torah
Yeshiva University

Weekly Torah readings in Elul
Weekly Torah readings from Deuteronomy